is a Japanese boxer and a former WBC, The Ring and Lineal Flyweight World Champion.

Amateur career 
He competed for his native country at the 2004 Summer Olympics in Athens, Greece, where he was stopped in the first round of the men's light flyweight division (– 48 kg) by Ethiopia's Endalkachew Kebede (21:26). Igarashi replaced Nauman Karim as a lucky loser, the Pakistani fighter dropped out "due to technical reasons".  Igarashi amassed an amateur record of 77 wins (16 KOs) 18 losses, and graduated from the Tokyo University of Agriculture.

Professional career 
After turning professional in 2006, he made his professional debut with a third-round knockout on August 13 of that year. Fighting out of Teiken Boxing Gym in Tokyo under Yūichi Kasai's instruction, Igarashi gained the Japanese flyweight interim title via a split decision on August 2, 2008. Although Igarashi lost to the regular champion Tomonobu Shimizu four months later, he captured the vacated Japanese flyweight title by a third-round knockout on February 5, 2011. He defended it once, until June of the same year.

Igarashi defeated Mexico's Wilbert Uicab in the WBC flyweight title eliminator via a unanimous decision at the Yoyogi National Stadium Second Gymnasium on November 6, 2011.

On July 16, 2012, Igarashi barely outpointed Sonny Boy Jaro via a split decision to win the WBC, The Ring and lineal flyweight titles in Kasukabe, Saitama. He defended his both titles against previously undefeated Nestor Daniel Narvaes via a majority decision in Sendai, Miyagi on November 3 of that year.

He fought former WBA minimumweight champion Akira Yaegashi in his second defense at the Ryōgoku Kokugikan on April 8, 2013. Igarashi and his team had initially planned the fight against Edgar Sosa. However, when it turned out that it would not be signed, Igarashi made a direct appeal to his promoter for the fight against Yaegashi. Igarashi mentioned that while his championship belt would be at stake, Yaegashi's popularity and recognition also would be on the line for that fight. Igarashi has so far fought against Yaegashi four times (once in his high school days, and three times in his university years) and won every time. Their trainers, Kasai (mentioned above) and Kōji Matsumoto (for Yaegashi) are high school alumni. Both are former OPBF champions and three-time world title challengers. Igarashi lost to Yaegashi in a unanimous decision.

Professional boxing record

{|class="wikitable" style="text-align:center
|-
!No.
!Result
!Record
!Opponent
!Type
!Round, time
!Date
!Location
!Notes
|- align=center
|29
|Loss
|23–3–3
|align=left|Sho Kimura
|TKO
|9 (12), 
|Dec 31, 2017
|align=left|
|align=left|
|- align=center
|28
|Draw
|23–2–3
|align=left|Miguel Cartagena
|TD
|3 (10), 
|Apr 1, 2017
|align=left|
|align=left|
|- align=center
|27
|Win
|23–2–2
|align=left|Weerachai Taboonrueang
|TKO
|2 (8), 
|Sep 10, 2016
|align=left|
|align=left|
|- align=center
|26
|Win
|22–2–2
|align=left|Joel Taduran
|UD
|10
|May 7, 2016
|align=left|
|align=left|
|- align=center
|25
|Draw
|21–2–2
|align=left|Jonathan Francisco
|TD
|5 (10), 
|Nov 24, 2015
|align=left|
|align=left|
|- align=center
|24
|Win
|21–2–1
|align=left|Renerio Arizala
|UD
|10
|Jun 6, 2015
|align=left|
|align=left|
|- align=center
|23
|Win
|20–2–1
|align=left|Efrain Perez
|TD
|10 (10), 
|Feb 7, 2015
|align=left|
|align=left|
|- align=center
|22
|Win
|19–2–1
|align=left|Renren Tesorio
|TD
|9 (10), 
|Sep 6, 2014
|align=left|
|align=left|
|- align=center
|21
|Win
|18–2–1
|align=left|Omar Soto
|KO
|9 (10), 
|Sep 7, 2013
|align=left|
|align=left|
|- align=center
|20
|Loss||17–2–1||align=left|Akira Yaegashi
|UD
|12
|Apr 8, 2013
|align=left|
|align=left|
|- align=center
|19
|Win||17–1–1||align=left|Nestor Narvaes
|MD
|12
|Nov 3, 2012
|align=left|
|align=left|
|- align=center
|18
|Win||16–1–1||align=left|Sonny Boy Jaro
|SD
|12
|Jul 16, 2012
|align=left|
|align=left|
|- align=center
|17
|Win||15–1–1||align=left|Wilbert Uicab
|UD
|12
|Nov 6, 2011
|align=left|
|
|- align=center
|16
|Win||14–1–1||align=left|Kenji Yoshida
|TD
|8 (10), 
|Jun 4, 2011
|align=left|
|align=left|
|- align=center
|15
|Win||13–1–1||align=left|Takayasu Kobayashi
|TKO
|3 (10), 
|Feb 5, 2011
|align=left|
|align=left|
|- align=center
|14
|Win||12–1–1||align=left|Armando Santos
|UD
|8
|Nov 6, 2010
|align=left|
|align=left|
|- align=center
|13
|Win||11–1–1||align=left|Rexon Flores
|KO
|1 (8), 
|Jul 3, 2010
|align=left|
|align=left|
|- align=center
|12
|Win||10–1–1||align=left|Abel Ochoa
|TKO
|6 (8), 
|Mar 6, 2010
|align=left|
|align=left|
|- align=center
|11
|Win||9–1–1||align=left|Erick Diaz Siregar
|RTD
|5 (8), 
|Nov 7, 2009
|align=left|
|align=left|
|- align=center
|10
|Win||8–1–1||align=left|Yuchi Carryboy
|TKO
|6 (8), 
|Jul 4, 2009
|align=left|
|align=left|
|- align=center
|9
|Loss||7–1–1||align=left|Tomonobu Shimizu
|UD
|10
|Dec 23, 2008
|align=left|
|align=left|
|- align=center
|8
|Win||7–0–1||align=left|Tomoya Kaneshiro
|SD
|10
|Aug 2, 2008
|align=left|
|align=left|
|- align=center
|7
|Win||6–0–1||align=left|Alex Buckie
|KO
|6 (8), 
|Apr 19, 2008
|align=left|
|align=left|
|- align=center
|6
|Draw||5–0–1||align=left|Naoto Saito
|MD
|8
|Dec 1, 2007
|align=left|
|align=left|
|- align=center
|5
|Win||5–0||align=left|Masatsugu Okada
|TKO
|7 (8), 
|Aug 4, 2007
|align=left|
|align=left|
|- align=center
|4
|Win||4–0||align=left|Tomoaki Handa
|UD
|6
|May 3, 2007
|align=left|
|align=left|
|- align=center
|3
|Win||3–0||align=left|Manachai Sithsaithong
|KO
|1 (8), 
|Feb 3, 2007
|align=left|
|align=left|
|- align=center
|2
|Win||2–0||align=left|Myung Jae-Sung
|TKO
|6 (6), 
|Nov 13, 2006
|align=left|
|align=left|
|- align=center
|1
|Win||1–0||align=left|Kim Yun-Woo
|KO
|3 (6), 
|Aug 12, 2006
|align=left|
|align=left|

See also 
 List of flyweight boxing champions
 List of Japanese boxing world champions
 Boxing in Japan
 1st AIBA Asian 2004 Olympic Qualifying Tournament
 2nd AIBA Asian 2004 Olympic Qualifying Tournament
 Japan at the 2004 Summer Olympics
 Boxing at the 2004 Summer Olympics – Light flyweight

References

External links 
 
 Toshiyuki Igarashi Biography and Olympic Results | Olympics at Sports-Reference.com
  
 Toshiyuki Igarashi - CBZ Profile

|-

1984 births
Living people
People from Yurihonjō
Sportspeople from Akita Prefecture
Flyweight boxers
World flyweight boxing champions
World Boxing Council champions
The Ring (magazine) champions
Boxers at the 2004 Summer Olympics
Olympic boxers of Japan
Japanese male boxers